Four teams (including the host Guatemala) from Central America and five from the Caribbean qualified to the 2011 CONCACAF U-20 Championship to be played in Guatemala.  Canada, Mexico, and United States automatically qualified.

Caribbean zone

Qualifying Playoff

U.S. Virgin Islands advance 3–0 on aggregate.

Group stage
All four group winners qualified for the 2011 CONCACAF U-20 Championship in Guatemala April 3–17, with the group runners-up advancing to a second group phase that determined the Caribbean's fifth and final entrant in the 12-team confederation finals.

Group A

Group B

Haiti withdrew from Caribbean qualifying for the CONCACAF Under-20 Championship, reducing Group B to three teams.

Group C

Group D
Because a host country could not be found for Group D, Trinidad played St. Vincent & the Grenadines, and Aruba played Suriname in two two-leg series with the winners facing off to determine the group winner.

Trinidad and Tobago qualified to the CONCACAF U-20 Championship.

CFU second round qualifying
One team qualified to the CONCACAF U-20 Championship.

Second phase

On December 28, it was announced that Suriname would host the group.

Central American zone

Group stage

Group A

Group B

Play-off

The Central American zone qualifying tournament was mired in controversy.

El Salvador had called-up United States under 17 international Dustin Corea to their national under-20 national team but did not write to FIFA request a change of association for the player as is required. Corea had previously played for United States in the 2009 CONCACAF U-17 Championship.
On 4 February 2012 UNCAF published CONCACAF's decision to deny El Salvador a place at the 2011 CONCACAF Under-20 Championship for fielding an ineligible player in four games.

As a result, El Salvador's matches versus Belize (1 December), Honduras (4 December) and both games Costa Rica (11 and 18 December) should have been forfeited due to fielding an ineligible player as per FIFA regulations. However matters were complicated as Belize would have won their Group A game 3-0 against El Salvador and qualified for the play-off had the forfeit been brought in at an earlier time. Instead El Salvador reached the play-off final and played Costa Rica twice – later forfeiting both games 3-0, allowing Costa Rica to qualify despite losing the matches 2-1 on aggregate.

References

Qual
CONCACAF U-20 Championship qualification